The 1904 North Carolina gubernatorial election was held on November 8, 1904. Democratic nominee Robert Broadnax Glenn defeated Republican nominee Charles J. Harris with 61.72% of the vote. At the time, Glenn was an attorney and former member of the state Senate, while Harris was a businessman and former member of the United States Industrial Commission.

Democratic convention
The Democratic convention was held on June 27, 1904.

Candidates 
Robert Broadnax Glenn, State Senator
Charles Manly Stedman, former Lieutenant Governor
Theodore F. Davidson, former North Carolina Attorney General
Wilfred D. Turner, incumbent Lieutenant Governor

Results

General election

Candidates
Major party candidates
Robert Broadnax Glenn, Democratic
Charles J. Harris, Republican

Other candidates
James M. Templeton, Prohibition
William A. Pegram, Socialist

Results

References

1904
North Carolina
Gubernatorial